Jamie Evans is an American cannabis and wine professional. She's an author, event producer, and creator of the website, The Herb Somm.

Education 
Evans studied viticulture at California Polytechnic State University San Luis Obispo. She also studied in the regions of Champagne and Alsace in France before earning the Wine Scholar Guild’s French Wine Scholar certification. In addition, Evans is a Certified Specialist of Wine.

Career 
Evans worked in the wine industry before she transitioned to writing about cannabis in 2017. During this time, she created a website called The Herb Somm. A year later, she began hosting cannabis events focused on wine and food pairings. Partnering with different cannabis chefs, she produced a cannabis dinner series known as Thursday Infused, held in San Francisco, California. In 2018, Francis Ford Coppola debuted his cannabis line known as The Grower's Series at a Thursday Infused event.

In 2020, Evans released her first book, The Ultimate Guide to CBD: Explore the World of Cannabidiol  and in 2021, her second book, Cannabis Drinks: Secrets to Crafting CBD and THC Beverages at Home, was published. She is co-editor of The Cooking Journal: A Cannabis Culinary Companion.

Evans is the CEO and co-founder of Herbacée, a non-alcoholic French-inspired cannabis wine brand.

Recognition 
In 2018, Evans was named a "Top 40 Under 40 Tastemaker" by Wine Enthusiast magazine and a "SevenFifty Daily Drinks Innovator" by SevenFifty Daily.

References 

21st-century American non-fiction writers
Businesspeople from the San Francisco Bay Area
American cannabis activists
Year of birth missing (living people)
Living people
California Polytechnic State University alumni
Businesspeople in the cannabis industry